Emil Kvanlid (4 July 1911, Målselv – 1 June 1998) was a Norwegian nordic combined skier who won the Nordic combined event at the Holmenkollen ski festival in both 1938 and 1940. Kvanlid belatedly earned the Holmenkollen medal in 1993.

External links
Emil Kvanlid Biography 
Holmenkollen medalists - click Holmenkollmedaljen for downloadable pdf file 
Holmenkollen winners since 1892 - click Vinnere for downloadable pdf file 

1911 births
1998 deaths
People from Målselv
Holmenkollen medalists
Holmenkollen Ski Festival winners
Norwegian male Nordic combined skiers
Sportspeople from Troms og Finnmark
20th-century Norwegian people